Count Kostia (French: Le comte Kostia) is a 1925 French silent historical film directed by Jacques Robert and starring Conrad Veidt, Genica Athanasiou and Claire Darcas. It is based on the 1863 novel of the same title by Victor Cherbuliez which is set in the Russian Empire. It is a lost film.

Cast
In alphabetical order
 Genica Athanasiou as Stéphane  
 Louise Barthe 
 Pierre Daltour as Gilbert de Saville  
 Claire Darcas as Comtesse Kostia  
 Henri Desmarets as Ivan  
 Milton J. Fahrney as Fritz 
 Robby Guichard 
 Yvette Langlais 
 André Nox as Vladimir Paulitch 
 Paul Pauley as Le pope Alexis  
 Florence Talma as Madame Lerins  
 Conrad Veidt as Comte Kostia

References

Bibliography
 John T. Soister. Conrad Veidt on Screen: A Comprehensive Illustrated Filmography. McFarland, 2002.

External links

1925 films
1920s historical drama films
Films directed by Jacques Robert
French silent feature films
1920s French-language films
French historical drama films
Films set in the 19th century
Films set in Russia
French black-and-white films
1925 drama films
Silent historical drama films
1920s French films